The Swedish Women's Curling Championship is the national championship of women's curling in Sweden. It has been held annually since 1962.

List of champions

(below teams line-up in order: fourth, third, second, lead, alternate, coach; skips marked bold)

References

See also
Swedish Men's Curling Championship
Swedish Mixed Curling Championship
Swedish Mixed Doubles Curling Championship
Swedish Junior Curling Championships
Swedish Senior Curling Championships